The Shelden Avenue Historic District is a commercial historic district located along Shelden, Lake, & Montezuma Avenues in Houghton, Michigan.  The district contains 43 contributing buildings (including the Douglass House and the Shelden-Dee Block, both separately listed) in an area of 22 acres. It was listed on the National Register of Historic Places in 1987.

History
The structures in the Shelden Avenue Historic District range in age from the 1870s to the 1980s, but were primarily built in 1880-1910, during the copper boom that brought waves of workers into the Keweenaw Peninsula.

Description
The Shelden Avenue Historic District contains the western Upper Peninsula's largest concentration of architecturally significant commercial buildings.  The district includes primarily commercial structures, but warehouses, lodge halls, municipal buildings, a movie theater, and a railroad passenger depot are also included within the district's boundaries.  The structures are built in a range of architectural styles, including Late Victorian commercial, Richardsonian Romanesque, Sullivanesque, Renaissance Revival, Prairie School, and gable-roofed vernacular buildings. Nearly all of the most significant structures were designed by architects from outside of the immediate area—typically from Detroit, Chicago, and Marquette, including the firms of  Charlton, Gilbert and DeMar and Henry L. Ottenheimer. The structures range between one and four stories in height, and are in general constructed from local materials including waste rock from copper mines and native red sandstone.

Gallery

References

Houghton, Michigan
Historic districts in Houghton County, Michigan
Historic districts on the National Register of Historic Places in Michigan
National Register of Historic Places in Houghton County, Michigan
Buildings and structures in Houghton, Michigan
Neoclassical architecture in Michigan
Renaissance Revival architecture in Michigan
Romanesque Revival architecture in Michigan